Part XIII - consists of Articles on trade and Commerce within the territory of India Articles 301 - 305 on Freedom of Trade and Commerce, and the power of Parliament and States to impose restrictions on the same Article 306 - Repealed - Replaced by the Constitution (Seventh Amendment) Act, 1956, s. 29 and Sch. Article 307 - Appointment of authority for carrying out the purposes of articles 301 to 307.

Parts and articles of the Constitution of India